Pilostenaspis is a genus of long-horned beetles in the family Cerambycidae. There are at least three described species in Pilostenaspis.

Species
These three species belong to the genus Pilostenaspis:
 Pilostenaspis copei Eya, 2015
 Pilostenaspis lateralis (LeConte, 1884)
 Pilostenaspis pilosella (Bates, 1892)

References

Further reading

 
 

Trachyderini